Tisha Monique is a British singer and actress, best known for being a member of the R&B band The 411. As an actress, she is best known as Missy in Kerching!, and Ella in The Basil Brush Show.

Early life
Martin attended the Sylvia Young Theatre School in London.

Career
Martin first appeared on British television in the CBBC sitcom Kerching! as the character Missy Lewis  2003. She played the sister of the main character, Taj. Missy worked in the Chill Out Grill as one of the idle waitresses who were rude to the customers and did little work as they spent most of their time texting or talking on their mobiles.

Her next part was in the also CBBC sitcom The Basil Brush Show, where she played the character of Ella, Molly's next door neighbour. Presently, Martin is a reader on  Jackanory Junior every Sunday on CBeebies.

In 2003 Martin joined girl group The 411 who enjoyed moderate success releasing three singles, two that reached the UK top 5 and 1 album before disbanding in 2008, however stating they would potentially reform in the future if the time was right.

On 30 March 2020 Martin released her debut single "Leave Your Mind" and continues to record and perform.

On 8 December 2021 it was confirmed that The 411 would reform and perform at ‘Mighty Hoopla’ in June 2022.

Discography

Albums

Singles

References

External links

Black British actresses
21st-century Black British women singers
British contemporary R&B singers
The 411 members
Place of birth missing (living people)
Year of birth missing (living people)
Living people
Alumni of the Sylvia Young Theatre School
English people of Kenyan descent